Linda Marie Emond (born May 22, 1959) is an American stage, film, and television actress. Emond has received three Tony Award nominations for her performances in Life (x) 3 (2003), Death of a Salesman (2012), and Cabaret (2014).

Early life and education
Emond was born in New Brunswick, New Jersey. She was raised in Orange County, California, and attended Loara Elementary, Ball Junior High and Loara High Schools (where she was homecoming queen). She graduated with a BA in Theatre Arts from California State University, Fullerton in 1982.  She earned an MFA from the Professional Actor Training Program at the University of Washington, Seattle.

Her first performance on stage was in high school as Jean Brodie in The Prime of Miss Jean Brodie.

Career

Her first professional stage performance, for which she earned her Equity card, was in On the Verge at The Empty Space Theatre in Seattle during her last semester of graduate school.

She worked extensively in Chicago where she went on to be nominated for five Joseph Jefferson Awards, winning it twice for her performances as Eliza Doolittle in Pygmalion and Paulina in The Winter's Tale.

She debuted on the New York stage in the Off-Broadway play Nine Armenians in 1996 at the Manhattan Theatre Club for which she received a Drama Desk Award nomination.

She has performed in Tony Kushner's Homebody/Kabul in three separate productions, the first at the New York Theatre Workshop in 2001, receiving a nomination for a Drama Desk Award as Outstanding Featured Actress, and winning both the Lucille Lortel Award for Outstanding Actress and the 2002 Obie Award for Performance. She appeared in the same play at the Mark Taper Forum, Los Angeles and at the Brooklyn Academy of Music in 2004.

In 2011, she appeared off-Broadway in Tony Kushner's The Intelligent Homosexual's Guide to Capitalism and Socialism with a Key to the Scriptures as “Empty”, a part that was written for her.

She was cast as "Elaine" in Craig Lucas's The Dying Gaul at the Vineyard Theater in 1998. She played the role of Queen Hermione in The Winter's Tale at the Public Theater production of Shakespeare in the Park in July 2010. In regional theatre, Emond has performed at Steppenwolf Theatre Company in Chicago in David Hare's The Secret Rapture in 1990 and at the Williamstown Theatre Festival in The Cherry Orchard (2004) and A.R. Gurney's Far East (1998).

On Broadway, Emond appeared in productions of the musical 1776 (1997) as Abigail Adams, and in Yasmina Reza's play Life x 3 (2003), for which she was nominated for the 2003 Tony Award as Best Featured Actress in a Play and for which she won the Outer Critics Circle Award. She starred as Linda Loman in the 2012 Broadway revival of Death of a Salesman, opposite Philip Seymour Hoffman and as Fraulein Schneider in the 2014 revival of Cabaret and received Tony nominations for both performances.

Emond's film and television roles include Simone Beck in Julie & Julia (2009), Georgia O'Keeffe (2009) a made-for-television Lifetime film, and as Abigail Adams in American Experience: John and Abigail Adams for PBS. In 2009, she played Mary Ann McCray in the Hallmark Hall of Fame television presentation of A Dog Named Christmas. She has had recurring roles in such New York-based television series as The Good Wife, Law & Order: Special Victims Unit, Gossip Girl, Wonderland, Elementary, and The Knick.

She is also a voiceover actor, having narrated over 50 episodes of the Lifetime series Intimate Portrait. As an audiobook reader, Emond is the recipient of four Audiofile Earphones Awards and was named one of their Best Voices of the Year.

Emond co-starred in Indignation (2016), an adaptation of Philip Roth's 2008 novel of the same name, playing Esther Messner, the mother of Logan Lerman's lead character.

She was a cast-member of the AMC comedy-drama Lodge 49, playing Connie Clark.

In 2022, Emond guest starred as Clara Barton on HBO's The Gilded Age.

Filmography

Films

Television

Awards and nominations

References

External links

Internet Off-Broadway Database Listing

1959 births
American film actresses
American stage actresses
American musical theatre actresses
American television actresses
Living people
Actresses from New Jersey
People from New Brunswick, New Jersey
University of Washington School of Drama alumni
21st-century American women